Selo pri Vranskem is a small settlement in the Municipality of Vransko in central Slovenia. It lies in the hills north of Brode. The area is part of the traditional region of Styria. The entire Municipality of Vransko is now included in the Savinja Statistical Region.

Name
The name of the settlement was changed from Selo to Selo pri Vranskem in 1953.

References

External links
Selo pri Vranskem at Geopedia

Populated places in the Municipality of Vransko